Chittamur mandal is one of the 34 mandals in Tirupati district in the Indian state of Andhra Pradesh. It is a part of Gudur revenue division with its headquarters at Chittamur.

History 
Chittamur mandal was a part of Nellore district until 2022. It was made part of the newly formed Tirupati district effective from 4 April 2022 by the Y. S. Jagan Mohan Reddy-led Government of Andhra Pradesh.

Biodiversity 
Chittamur mandal has brackish water ecosystem. Every year, terrestrial and aquatic birds migrate to Pulicat Lake for a temporary stay. The ecosystem covers an area of  including parts of the mandal along with Doravarisatram, Sullurpeta, Tada and Vakadu mandals. The terrestrial birds include painted storks, large egrets, little egrets, grey pelicans, grey herons; water birds include northern pintails, black-winged stilts, northern shovelers, common teal, seagulls, terns, sandpipers, and common coots.

Demographics 

It had a sex ratio of 963. Scheduled Castes and Scheduled Tribes made up 16,035 and 5,905 of the population respectively. It had a literacy rate of 57.65% with 64.13% among males and 50.95% among females.

Administration 
Chittamur mandal is a part of Gudur revenue division. Its headquarters are located at Chittamur. As of 2011 census, the mandal comprises the following 41 villages:

 Note: Devuni Khandrika, Gangupalem, Kothapalem, Padarthivari Khandrika, Pothunayanipalle, Rayareddipalem and Vadlavanipalle were uninhabited

Politics 
Chittamur mandal is a part of Gudur Assembly constituency and Tirupati Lok Sabha constituency. , the mandal had 29,607 eligible voters with 14,712 male voters and 14,895 female voters. Varaprasad Rao Velagapalli is representing the Gudur constituency as the Member of the Legislative Assembly (MLA) in Andhra Pradesh Legislative Assembly, and Maddila Gurumoorthy is representing the Tirupati constituency as the Member of Parliament (MP) in Lok Sabha.

References 

Mandals in Tirupati district